Rnd3 is a small (~21 kDa) signaling G protein (to be specific, a GTPase), and is a member of the Rnd subgroup of the Rho family of GTPases. It is encoded by the gene RND3.

Like other members of the Rho family of Ras-related GTPases it regulates the organization of the actin cytoskeleton in response to extracellular growth factors.

Regulation
Most Rho family members cycle between an inactive GDP-bound form and an active GTP-bound form. However, members of the Rnd subgroup of the Rho family are exceptions to this, binding detectably only to GTP, while having low GTPase activity, if any. Instead, Rnd family proteins are regulated through other mechanisms that control their production, degradation, phosphorylation, and localization.

Interactions 

In its GTP-bound form, RhoA exposes regions that allow it to interact with downstream targets. Rnd3 contains a region which is similar to the one RhoA exposes for interaction with ROCK1, allowing Rnd3 to compete with RhoA for interaction with ROCK1. By binding to ROCK1, Rnd3 inhibits it from phosphorylating downstream targets necessary for stress fiber formation. Rnd3 is also directly involved in controlling RhoA activity through suppression of PLEKHG5  and activation of ARHGAP5. Interaction with UBXD5 has also been shown.

References

Further reading